Wang Jinxian (born 12 January 1996) is a Chinese footballer who currently plays for Changchun Yatai in the Chinese Super League.

Club career
Wang Jinxian started his football career when he was joined Dalian Yiteng's youth academy in 2005. He transferred to Chinese Super League side Dalian Aerbin (now known as Dalian Professional) in March 2012 when Dalian Aerbin bought the U17 team of Dalian Yiteng. He was then loaned to China League Two side Liaoning Youth during the 2013 season. In 2014, Wang returned to Dalian and was promoted to the club's first team squad. He made his debut for the club on 9 August 2014 in a 1-1 draw against Changchun Yatai, coming on as a substitute for Bruno Meneghel in the 86th minute. He scored his first goal on 16 May 2015 in a 3-1 win against Shenzhen FC. On 2 September 2016, Wang received a six match ban for violent behavior in an "aggressive manner that was excessive in force and brutal".

International career
Wang made his debut for the Chinese national team on 10 January 2017 in a 2-0 loss against Iceland in the 2017 China Cup, coming on as a substitute for Hui Jiakang in the 72nd minute.

Career statistics

Club statistics
.

International statistics

Honours

Club
Dalian Professional
China League One: 2017

References

External links
 
 

1996 births
Living people
Chinese footballers
Footballers from Wuhan
Dalian Professional F.C. players
Chinese Super League players
China League One players
China League Two players
Association football midfielders
China international footballers
21st-century Chinese people